Ernest Augustus, Duke of York and Albany (17 September 1674 – 14 August 1728), was the younger brother of George I of Great Britain. Ernest Augustus was a soldier and served with some distinction under Emperor Leopold I during the Nine Years' War and the War of the Spanish Succession. In 1715, he became Prince-Bishop of Osnabrück.

Early life
Ernest Augustus was born on 17 September 1674. He was the sixth son and seventh child of Ernest Augustus, Elector of Brunswick-Lüneburg, and Sophia of the Palatinate, and the youngest brother of the future George I of Great Britain.

Ernest Augustus's father was Prince-Bishop of Osnabrück, and the first five years of his life were spent in Osnabrück, until his father became Duke of Brunswick-Lüneburg and the family moved to Hanover.

His education followed the customs of the time, by which German princes were expected to travel to foreign courts to make contacts and learn how to conduct diplomatic relations. In summer 1687, he visited the French court at Versailles via Amsterdam. While there, the two brothers were popular with the French royal family.

Military career 

After his visit to France, he trod the well-worn path for young German princes of those times and served as a soldier. His family interests were aligned with those of Emperor Leopold I and so he fought against the French in the Nine Years' War and was present at the Battle of Neerwinden in 1693. He continued his military career during the War of Spanish Succession and was actively engaged in the Siege of Lille (1708).

After his father's death, his elder brother George inherited all his lands and titles, including the electorate. His father, as part of the conditions he had to fulfil to acquire an electorship, had adopted primogeniture, thus disinheriting younger sons. Unlike his four elder brothers, Ernest Augustus did not oppose this change; consequently he got on well with George, who trusted him. He was a prominent member of his brother's court at Herrenhausen, in Hanover, receiving diplomatic visitors and taking an active role in the cultural interests of the court.  His influence may have helped secure the position of Kapellmeister for Handel at the court.

Dynastic role 

With his accession to the British throne, George moved to London and Ernest Augustus took on the mantle of the senior head of the family in Brunswick-Lüneburg. In this capacity, he became regent in all but name, and took on the duty of care for George's seven-year-old grandson, Frederick Lewis, the future Prince of Wales and father-to-be of George III. Frederick was left in Germany as a diplomatic move, to reassure the populace and any ambitious neighbouring states of the family's continuing commitment to its German lands.

Upon the death of Charles Joseph, Elector of Trier, in 1715, under the terms of the Treaty of Westphalia, it was the turn of a Protestant to become Prince-Bishop of Osnabrück. This position as a Prince of the Holy Roman Empire and ruler of an independent principality had to alternate between Catholics and Lutherans according to the treaty. Usually a member of the House of Welf held the office whenever the turn came to Protestants. As Ernest Augustus's elder brother Maximilian William of Brunswick-Luneburg had become a Catholic, King George nominated Ernest Augustus to be elected by the Osnabrück cathedral chapter. The position was not just an honorific, and so Ernest Augustus had to divide his time between Schloss Osnabrück and the court at Herrenhausen.

In 1716, Ernst visited England where, on 29 June 1716, he was created Duke of York and Albany, and Earl of Ulster. On 30 April 1718 (OS), he was created a Knight of the Garter together with his grand-nephew Frederick, later Prince of Wales.

Death 

After his sojourn in Great Britain, Ernest Augustus returned to his previous life and continued to divide his time between Schloss Osnabrück and the court at Herrenhausen, while actively managing the affairs of both states. He died at Osnabrück on 14 August 1728 (NS) and was buried there. One year earlier his brother George I had also died there on a journey. 
Believed to be homosexual, Ernest Augustus never married. Upon his death, his British and Irish peerages became extinct.

Arms

Ancestors

Notes

References

External links
 

House of Hanover
Dukes of York and Albany
Peers of Great Britain created by George I
Earls of Ulster
Peers of Ireland created by George I
Knights of the Garter
Lutheran Prince-Bishops of Osnabrück
Military personnel from Osnabrück
1674 births
1728 deaths
18th-century Lutheran bishops
Burials at Berggarten Mausoleum, Herrenhausen (Hanover)
Sons of monarchs